Claes-Gösta Elfsberg (born 26 November 1948) is a Swedish television journalist.

Elfsberg grew up in the district of Svedmyra in southern Stockholm. He received his upper-secondary education at Norra Real in Stockholm and then studied at the Department of Journalism, Media and Communication (JMK) at Stockholm University, from where he dropped out to work as a trainee at the daily news program Rapport at Sveriges Television (SVT) in 1971. He presented the programme for the first time in 1975 and then worked as a news presenter for over thirty years, eventually earning the nickname "Mr. Rapport". He temporarily left Rapport in 2003 to host the interview program 24 minuter on the SVT channel SVT24. He has also presented the SVT program Dokument utifrån. From January 2005 to December 2007, Elfsberg worked as the "ombudsman of the viewers" at SVT. In January 2008 it was announced that Elfsberg would lead the news program Play Rapport on SVT's video on demand service SVT Play. Elfsberg presented the news programme Aktuellt between March 2012 and November 30, 2015, and since January 15, 2016 has been the Friday presenter for the breakfast television programme Gomorron Sverige. 

Elfsberg is currently married to Monica Elfsberg and has three children from two earlier marriages.

References 

1948 births
Living people
Journalists from Stockholm
Stockholm University alumni
Swedish television journalists